There are many $50 banknotes, bills, or coins, including:

 Australian fifty-dollar note
 Canadian fifty-dollar bill
 New Zealand fifty-dollar note
 United States fifty-dollar bill
 Nicaraguan fifty-cordoba note
 Hong Kong fifty-dollar note, One of the banknotes of the Hong Kong dollar
 One of the banknotes of Zimbabwe

Other currencies that issue $50 banknotes, bills, or coins are: